Kristina Ulrika Nordenstam (born 4 March 1969), better known by her stage name Stina Nordenstam, is a Swedish singer-songwriter and producer.

Life and career
Nordenstam was born in Stockholm on 4 March 1969. As a child, she was highly influenced by her father's classical and jazz music collection. Her debut album, Memories of a Color, was released in 1991. Her album And She Closed Her Eyes was released in 1994, and was named the best Swedish album of all time by Sonic on their 2013 list of the 100 best Swedish albums. 1997's Dynamite began a more experimental path—most of the album was filled with distorted guitars and unusual beats. A 1998 cover album, People Are Strange, followed in the same vein. In 2001, Nordenstam went with a more pop-influenced sound on This Is Stina Nordenstam, which features guest vocals from Brett Anderson. Nordenstam's 2004 album The World Is Saved continued the path set on This Is..., and is her last album .

Her last two known recordings were included on the album Snow Borne Sorrow and the EP Money for All, both by English band Nine Horses. She also provided vocals for Vangelis' song "Ask the Mountains", Yello's "To the Sea", and a collaboration with Anton Fier. In 2000, Nordenstam featured on a track from Danish prog-rockers Mew's second album Half the World Is Watching Me. The track was later re-recorded for the band's international debut Frengers. Nordenstam's vocals on her track "A Walk in the Park" were used as a sample for two songs by the Canadian electronic duo Crystal Castles, "Violent Dreams" and "Vietnam".

Nordenstam presented a sound installation at the Way Out West music festival in 2013, and, in 2014, Nordenstam was one of 12 inaugural inductees into the Swedish Music Hall of Fame.

Nordenstam is autistic.

Musical style
Nordenstam's voice was called "delicate", "serious", and "plucky" by Autostraddle. The Irish Times described Nordenstam's voice as "childlike" with "hushed and fragile" tones and a "soft and gentle" timbre, contrasting it with her "mighty and immeasurable" sound. Her voice was described by Adam Brent Houghtaling, author of This Will End in Tears: The Miserablist Guide to Music, as "very fragile" and "wispy", and he stated that her music "melds a lot of jazz and folk and ambient pop all together". Her music has also been described as avant-pop. Sally Shapiro has listed Nordenstam as an influence on her music.

Discography

Studio albums

EPs

Singles

As lead artist

As featured artist

Guest appearances
 Fleshquartet – "Dancin' Madly Backwards", "It Won't Hurt Me", "Walk", and "Someone like Me" from Flow (1993)
 Zbigniew Preisner – Aberdeen: Original Film Soundtrack (2000)
 Mew – "Her Voice Is Beyond Her Years" from Half the World Is Watching Me (2000)
 Mew – "Her Voice Is Beyond Her Years" from Frengers (2003)
 Nine Horses – "Wonderful World" from Snow Borne Sorrow (2005)
 Filur – "Into the Wasteland" from Into the Wasteland (2006)
 Nine Horses – "Wonderful World (Burnt Friedman Remix)" and "Birds Sing for Their Lives" from Money for All (2007)

References

External links
 

1969 births
Living people
Musicians from Stockholm
Swedish folk musicians
Swedish singer-songwriters
English-language singers from Sweden
People on the autism spectrum